Inus Airport  is an airfield serving Inus, on the Bougainville Island, in Papua New Guinea.

References

External links
 

Airports in Papua New Guinea
Autonomous Region of Bougainville